The John T. and Marietta Carey House is a historic residence located in Denison, Iowa, United States. The house is associated with John Carey, who served for six years as Denison's mayor.  During that time the city's sewer system was put in, street signs were put up, preparations were made for mail delivery, the Carnegie Library and the courthouse were built, a telephone exchange was installed and the city more than doubled in size.  President Theodore Roosevelt and Treasury Secretary L. M. Shaw, a former Iowa governor, visited Denison when Carey was mayor.   He also served in county government.  Marietta (Greek) Carey was the daughter of early pioneers to the county, and she was one of the first people born in the county.  The two-story, frame, Queen-Anne style house was built in 1893.  It is a mail-order house from the George F. Barber & Co. in Knoxville, Tennessee.  The house was listed on the National Register of Historic Places in 2000.

References

Houses completed in 1893
Denison, Iowa
Queen Anne architecture in Iowa
Houses on the National Register of Historic Places in Iowa
National Register of Historic Places in Crawford County, Iowa
Houses in Crawford County, Iowa